"What Say You" is a song recorded by American country music artist Travis Tritt featuring John Mellencamp.  It was released in August 2004 as the second single from Tritt's album My Honky Tonk History.  The song reached number 21 on the Billboard Hot Country Songs chart.  The song was written by Michael Bradford and Frank J. Myers.

Chart performance

References 

2004 singles
2004 songs
Travis Tritt songs
John Mellencamp songs
Songs written by Michael Bradford
Songs written by Frank J. Myers
Song recordings produced by Billy Joe Walker Jr.
Columbia Records singles
Male vocal duets